Electoral firsts in the United States:

 List of first women lawyers and judges in the United States
 List of female United States Cabinet members
 List of first openly LGBT politicians in the United States

See also 

 Election

Lists of political office-holders in the United States
Lists of firsts
Political history of the United States
United States-related lists of superlatives
United States politics-related lists